Holte or Holthe is the surname of:

 Holte baronets
Sir Thomas Holte, 1st Baronet (1571–1654), English owner of Aston Hall
Sir Robert Holte, 2nd Baronet (?-1679)
Sir Charles Holte, 3rd Baronet (1649–1722)
Sir Clobery Holte, 4th Baronet (1682–1729)
Sir Lister Holte, 5th Baronet (1720–1770)
Sir Charles Holte, 6th Baronet (1721–1782)

 Amoene van Haersolte (née Van Holthe tot Echten), Dutch noblewoman and author; winner of first P. C. Hooft Award
Anders Holte (1849–1937), Norwegian sea captain and navigator
Arne Holte (1946–), Norwegian psychologist
Beatrix von Holte (ca.1250–1327), Prince Abbess of Essen from 1292 to 1327 
Burchard von Holte (?-1118), Bishop of Münster from 1098 to 1118 
Eva Bull Holte (1922–1993), Norwegian painter, wife of J. B.
Fritz Christian Holte (1925–), Norwegian economist
Geir Holte (born 1959), Norwegian cross country skier, brother of Tor Håkon
Johan Berthin Holte (1915–2002), Norwegian businessperson, husband of E. B.
Josef Holte (1912–1944), German soldier
Jørgen Holte (1944–), Norwegian politician 
Knut Holte (1967–), Norwegian footballer
Lars Holte (1966–), Norwegian DJ
Patricia Louise Holte (1944–), stage name Patti LaBelle
Ludolf von Holte (?–1247), Bishop of Münster from 1226 to 1247
Poppo von Paderborn (?–1083), possibly Poppo von Holte, Bishop of Paderborn from 1076
Tess Uriza Holthe (1966–), Filipino-American writer
Tor Håkon Holte (born 1958), Norwegian cross country skier, brother of Geir
Wigbold von Holte (?–1304), Archbishop of Cologne (Köln) from 1297 to 1304 
Wilhelm I. von Holte (?–1260), Bishop of Münster from 1259 to 1260

See also
Holt (surname)

Norwegian-language surnames